Laiagam is situated in the west of Enga Province, Papua New Guinea.  It is the main town of the Lagaip-Porgera District; the largest and most populated district of Enga's four administrative districts.

Populated places in Enga Province